Petra Fuhrmann (19 October 1955 – 22 July 2019) was a German politician who was a member of the Landtag of Hesse for 20 years.

Life 

Fuhrmann was born in 1955 in Wiesbaden. She studied political science and chemistry at TU Darmstadt, graduating in 1982. A short time later she joined the Social Democratic Party of Germany (SPD).

Fuhrmann first became a member of the Hessian Landtag in 1994. From 1997 she was the spokesperson on social issues for the SPD parliamentary group, and also deputy chairperson of the parliamentary group until 2003. She remained a member of the Landtag until 2014.

She also sat on the district council of the Hochtaunuskreis from 2001 and was part of the advisory council of the Hessenpark.

She was considered for the same position by  ahead of the 2003 election.

Fuhrmann was 63 years old when she died in July 2019. She lived in Friedrichsdorf.

References

External links 
 Obituaries 

1955 births
2019 deaths
Politicians from Wiesbaden
Technische Universität Darmstadt alumni
Social Democratic Party of Germany politicians
Members of the Landtag of Hesse